Rhipha persimilis is a moth in the family Erebidae. It was described by Walter Rothschild in 1909. It is found in Costa Rica, French Guiana, Ecuador and Peru.

Subspecies
Rhipha persimilis persimilis
Rhipha persimilis marginata (Rothschild, 1909) (Costa Rica)

References

Phaegopterina
Arctiinae of South America
Moths of Central America
Moths described in 1909
Taxa named by Walter Rothschild